George Joseph Webber (6 December 1895 – 31 May 1950) was a British athlete who competed mainly in the 3000 metre team. He was born in Ipswich and affiliated with Highgate Harriers. He competed for Great Britain in the 1924 Summer Olympics held in Paris, France in the 3000 metre team where he won the silver medal with his team mates Bertram Macdonald and Herbert Johnston.

References

External links
 

1895 births
1950 deaths
Athletes (track and field) at the 1924 Summer Olympics
Olympic athletes of Great Britain
Olympic silver medallists for Great Britain
Sportspeople from Ipswich
English male long-distance runners
Medalists at the 1924 Summer Olympics
Olympic silver medalists in athletics (track and field)